The 49th Annual Tony Awards was held at the Minskoff Theatre on June 4, 1995, and broadcast by CBS. Hosts were Glenn Close, Gregory Hines, and Nathan Lane.

The ceremony

The musical sequence was "Broadway Songs We've Never Done, and Never Will" with Gregory Hines and Nathan Lane.

Presenters were: Maria Conchita Alonso, Lauren Bacall, Alec Baldwin, Carol Burnett, Red Buttons, Walter Cronkite, Jim Dale, Laurence Fishburne, Gloria Foster, Michele Lee, Lonette McKee, Robert Morse, Sarah Jessica Parker, Jon Secada, Patrick Stewart, Elaine Stritch, Marlo Thomas, Kathleen Turner, Joan Van Ark.

Musicals represented:

Smokey Joe's Cafe "On Broadway" - The Men;
How to Succeed in Business Without Really Trying "Brotherhood of Man" - Matthew Broderick, Lillias White and Company; 
Show Boat "Kim's Charleston" - Elaine Stritch, Tammy Amerson and Company; 
Sunset Boulevard - "As If We Never Said Goodbye" - Glenn Close and Company.

A special segment,"Broadway Across America" featured: Buskers in San Francisco ("Busker Alley" - Tommy Tune and Company); Master Class in Los Angeles (Scene with Zoe Caldwell and Audra McDonald); Grease in Boston ("We Go Together" - Company); Hello, Dolly! in San Diego.

Award winners and nominees
Winners are in bold

Special awards
Regional Theatre Tony Award
Goodspeed Opera House

Tony Honors for Excellence in Theatre
National Endowment for the Arts

Special Tony Award
Carol Channing — Lifetime Achievement
Harvey Sabinson — Lifetime Achievement

Multiple nominations and awards

These productions had multiple nominations:

11 nominations: Sunset Boulevard
10 nominations: Show Boat 
9 nominations: Indiscretions 
7 nominations: The Heiress and Smokey Joe's Cafe  
5 nominations: Love! Valour! Compassion!  
4 nominations: How to Succeed in Business Without Really Trying 
3 nominations: Arcadia, Having Our Say and The Molière Comedies 
2 nominations: Hamlet 

The following productions received multiple awards.

7 wins: Sunset Boulevard
5 wins: Show Boat 
4 wins: The Heiress  
2 wins: Love! Valour! Compassion!

See also
 Drama Desk Awards
 1995 Laurence Olivier Awards – equivalent awards for West End theatre productions
 Obie Award
 New York Drama Critics' Circle
 Theatre World Award
 Lucille Lortel Awards

References

External links
Official Site Tony Awards

Tony Awards ceremonies
1995 in theatre
1995 theatre awards
Tony
1995 in New York City